Michael Boyle  (c. 1580 – 27 December 1635), was Bishop of Waterford and Lismore.

Biography
Boyle was born in London, as the son of Michael Boyle, and brother of Richard Boyle, Archbishop of Tuam. Michael Boyle entered Merchant Taylors' School, London, in 1587, and proceeded to St John's College, Oxford, in 1593. He took the degrees of B.A. (5 December 1597), M.A. (25 June 1601), B.D. (9 July 1607) and D.D. (2 July 1611).

Boyle became a fellow of his college, and no high opinion was entertained there of his probity in matters affecting his own interests. Boyle was appointed vicar of Finedon in Northamptonshire. Through the influence of his relative,  Richard, Earl of Cork, became archdeacon of Cork and Cloyne, Dean of Lismore in 1614, and, finally, in 1619, Bishop of Waterford and Lismore.

Until his death in Waterford on 27 December 1635 Boyle held several other appointments: the chancellorship of Lismore and Cashel and the treasurership of Waterford. He was buried in Waterford Cathedral.

Family
Boyle married twice; first to Dorothy Fish, daughter of George Fish of South Hill, Bedfordshire, and second to Christian, daughter of Thomas Bellott of Chester. Both marriages were childless. His brother Richard was the father of the younger Michael Boyle

Notes

References
 

Attribution

Ware's Bishops of Ireland, 1739
 Robinson's Register of Merchant Taylors' School, i. 30
 Wood's Athenæ Oxonienses (Bliss), ii. 88
 Wood's Fasti (Bliss), i. 275, 292, 321, 344; 
 Charles Richard Elrington, Life of Ussher, 1848
 Cotton's Fasti Ecclesiæ Hibernicæ, 1851; Brady's Kecords of Cork, Cloyne, and Eoss, 1863.

Year of birth uncertain
1580s births
1635 deaths
Anglican clergy from London
People from County Waterford
People educated at Merchant Taylors' School, Northwood
Deans of Lismore
Bishops of Waterford and Lismore (Church of Ireland)
17th-century Anglican bishops in Ireland
Michael
Archdeacons of Cork
Archdeacons of Cloyne